Osman Pazvantoğlu (1758 – January 27, 1807 in Vidin) was an Ottoman soldier, governor of Vidin after 1794, and a rebel against Ottoman rule.

He is also remembered as the friend of Rigas Feraios, a Greek revolutionary poet, whom he tried to rescue from the Ottoman authorities in Belgrade.

Biography
His grandfather was originally from the Eyalet of Bosnia, and part of the guards of the city of Sofia, hence Osman's name: pasban-oğlu, "son of the guard". Initially a mercenary in service to the Wallachian prince Nicholas Mavrogenes, Osman Pazvantoğlu disobeyed the latter on one occasion, and was saved from reprisals through Feraios' intervention.

Having gathered a large army of mercenaries, he rebelled against the Ottoman sultan Selim III, and, acting as an independent ruler, he minted his own coins and had diplomatic relations with foreign states (including the French Republic). In 1798, he held territories which spread from the Danube to the Balkan Mountains and from Belgrade to Varna. In 1793, he undertook a military expedition to the Pashaluk of Belgrade but was soundly defeated by the Serbs in Ottoman service at the Battle of Kolari.

The 1797 military expedition of Hüseyin Küçük (having 100,000 soldiers) failed in its goal to conquer Vidin and capture Pazvantoğlu, and indirectly resulted in the fall and execution of Prince Constantine Hangerli, after Küçük accused him of not having provided the Ottoman Army with enough funds. He also attempted to annex the Sanjak of Smederevo but was stopped by Stanko Arambašić and his 16,000 Serbian soldiers in Ottoman service. In 1799, the Ottoman sultan forgave Pazvantoğlu's rebellion and agreed to make him a pasha.

Pazvantoğlu often made violent raids in Wallachia, where he often set on fire the cities which he plundered. In 1800, his troops, colloquially known as pasvangii, set on fire a large portion of the city of Craiova: out of 7,000 houses, only around 300 were still standing after the fire stopped. This caused Prince Alexander Mourousis to hand in his resignation to Sultan Selim, a rare statement of defeat in the context of Phanariote reigns.

In late January 1802, Bucharest was gripped by panic after rumors spread that the pasha had sent his army in its direction. Prince Michael Soutzos left the city and ordered its defense by the remaining garrison of Albanians, but disagreements over payment owed led the troops themselves to discard the place; the city soon fell to widespread disorder and the brief rule of beggars and vagabonds (who apparently mimicked a coronation ceremony) — this episode was ended by the violent intervention of Ottoman troops stationed in the vicinity, and ultimately led to Soutzos' deposition.

In 1809, retaliation campaign of Oltenian hajduks led by Iancu Jianu culminated in the attack and partial destruction of Turnu Măgurele (which was officially administered as an Ottoman kaza, but had become a base for the rebellion leader).

Pazvantoğlu's incursions soon became infamous in all of Wallachia. The expression "as in the time of Pazvante Chioru' ", rather common in Romanian, was meant to indicate a time of trouble and ill-government; in time, it simply came to mean "extremely old".

Legacy
 
 
In Vidin, Bulgaria, the capital of Pazvantoğlu's domain, there are several landmarks built during his rule that still stand today. These include the military facility Krastata Kazarma (from Bulgarian: Cross-shaped Barracks), built in 1801, and a mosque (1801-1802) with a library building (1802–1803), dedicated to the pasha's father. All of them are classed as monuments of culture.

The mosque-library compound is thought to have also included a madrasah (Islamic school) and a small Muslim cloister, both of which have not survived until today.

Notes

References
Neagu Djuvara, Între Orient și Occident. Țările române la începutul epocii moderne ("Between Orient and Occident. The Romanian Lands at the beginning of the modern era"), Humanitas, Bucharest, 1995
Ștefan Ionescu, Bucureștii în vremea fanarioților ("Bucharest in the Time of the Phanariotes"), Editura Dacia, Cluj, 1974
Povestea lui Pazvante Chioru
Pazvantoglu.com

1758 births
1807 deaths
18th-century Ottoman military personnel
19th-century Ottoman military personnel
People from the Ottoman Empire of Bosnian descent
Rebels from the Ottoman Empire
Ottoman mercenaries
Pashas
Ottoman period in the history of Bulgaria
Ottoman period in Romania
History of Wallachia
People from Vidin
History of Vidin
Rigas Feraios
Kirdzhalis